First Methodist Episcopal Church, South may refer to one of several churches in the United States:

First Methodist Episcopal Church, South (Ozark, Arkansas), listed on the National Register of Historic Places (NRHP) in Franklin County, Arkansas
First Methodist Episcopal Church, South (Perry, Florida), listed on the NRHP in Taylor County, Florida
First Methodist Episcopal Church, South (Atlanta, Georgia), listed on the NRHP in Fulton County, Georgia
First Methodist Episcopal Church, South (Vinita, Oklahoma), NRHP-listed
First Methodist Episcopal Church, South (Humboldt, Tennessee), listed on the NRHP in Gibson County, Tennessee

See also
First Methodist Episcopal Church (disambiguation)